Hakavik Power Station is a 7 MW hydroelectric power plant at Øvre Eiker in Buskerud, Norway, located 25 metres above sea level.

The power station was inaugurated in 1922. It generates only railway traction current, single phase 55 kV at 16 2/3 hertz. The station is the starting point of a powerline to Sande and another to Sundhaugen Switching Station, where a 55 kV-line to Asker and another one to Neslandsvatn over Nordagutu and Skollenberg departs. The only other power station in Norway to do this is Kjofossen Power Station.

See also

 Kjofossen Power Station

References

External links 

 Journal Extra

Buildings and structures in Buskerud
Hydroelectric power stations in Norway
Øvre Eiker